Northern Rivers was an electoral district of the Legislative Assembly in the Australian state of Western Australia from 1989 to 1996.

Members for Northern Rivers

Election results

Northern Rivers